Bad Reichenhall station is a railway station in the municipality of Bad Reichenhall, located in the Berchtesgadener Land district in Bavaria, Germany.

References

Railway stations in Bavaria
Buildings and structures in Berchtesgadener Land
Railway stations in Germany opened in 1866